Khasadan-e Olya (also Romanized as Khasādān-e ‘Olyā; also known as Khasādān-e Bālā and Khasāden) is a village in Machian Rural District, Kelachay District, Rudsar County, Gilan Province, Iran. At the 2006 census, its population was 312, in 75 families.

References 

Populated places in Rudsar County